Goalball at the 1992 Summer Paralympics consisted of men's and women's team events.

Medal summary

Medal table

Men's tournament

Group A

Group B

Final round

Women's tournament

Preliminary round

Final round

References 

 

1992 Summer Paralympics events
1992
Goalball in Spain